The 2013 FAM Youth Championship, includes the youth teams of all the Dhivehi League teams and 4 other teams from any part of the Maldives who want to participate (Mahibadhoo Sports Club, Kelaa Naalhi Sports, Eydhafushi Zuvaanunge Club and Club Green Street). The age group of this tournament is Under-21.

Participated Teams
It was announced that only 10 teams can participate in the competition  but later, the Football Association of Maldives decided to give permission for all the teams who wants to participate, in order to give more young stars to show their capability in the tournament.

Group 1
 Maziya Sports & Recreation Club
 Club All Youth Linkage
 VB Addu Football Club
 Eydhafushi Zuvaanunge Club

Group 2
 Victory Sports Club
 Club Valencia
 New Radiant Sports Club
 BG Sports Club

Group 3
 Club Eagles
 Mahibadhoo Sports Club
 Kelaa Naalhi Sports
 Club Green Streets

Group stage
Times are Indian Ocean, Maldives (UTC+5).

Group 1

Group 2

Group 3

Third placed teams

Quarter-finals

Semi-finals

Final

Statistics

Top goal scorer

 Mohamed Muslih (Club Eagles with 6 goals)

Best 4 players

 Ahmed Visam (Club Valencia)
 Mohamed Shabeen Adam (BG Sports Club)
 Ahmed Shujau (VB Addu FC)
 Ibrahim Labaan Shareef (Club Valencia)

Best coach

 Aslam Abdul Raheem (Club Valencia)

Fair play team

 New Radiant SportsClub

Hat-tricks

Prize money
The prize money given to the top two teams:

Notes

References

External links
 2013 FAM Youth Championship's Official Website at Facebook

FAM Youth Championship
4